Altro may refer to:

Altro (album), by Italian singer Mina
Altro, Kentucky, a community in Breathitt County
Melissa Altro, a Canadian actress and voice actress